St Anne's is a Gaelic Athletic Association club in Bohernabreena, Dublin, Ireland.

It was founded in 1937 and caters for a range of age groups from four years upwards in the areas of Tallaght and Firhouse.

Honours
 Dublin Senior Football Championship Runner-Up 1987
 Dublin Senior Football League Winners 1989
 Dublin Intermediate Football Championship (2) 1964, 1985
 Dublin Junior D Football Championship: Winners 2011
 Dublin Minor C Football Championship: Winners 2009
 Dublin AFL Div. 10S Winners 2009

References

1937 establishments in Ireland
Gaelic games clubs in South Dublin (county)
Gaelic football clubs in South Dublin (county)